The 1970 European Formula Two season was contested over 8 rounds. Tecno Racing Team driver Clay Regazzoni clinched the championship title.

Teams and drivers

Calendar

Note:

Race 2, 5, 6 and 7 were held in two heats, with results shown in aggregate.

Race 1 and 4 were held with two semi-final heats and the final run, with time only shown for the final.

Race 1, 4 and 6 was won by a graded driver, all graded drivers are shown in Italics.

Final point standings

Driver

For every race points were awarded: 9 points to the winner, 6 for runner-up, 4 for third place, 3 for fourth place, 2 for fifth place and 1 for sixth place. No additional points were awarded. The best 6 results count.

Note:

Only drivers which were not graded were able to score points.

Race 5 not all points were awarded (not enough finishers).

References

Formula Two
European Formula Two Championship seasons